Meige's syndrome is a type of dystonia. It is also known as Brueghel's syndrome and oral facial dystonia. It is actually a combination of two forms of dystonia, blepharospasm and oromandibular dystonia (OMD).

When OMD is combined with blepharospasm, it may be referred to as Meige's Syndrome named after Henri Meige, the French neurologist who first described the symptoms in detail in 1910. The symptoms usually begin between the ages of 30 and 70 years old and appear to be more common in women than in men (2:1 ratio). The combination of upper and lower dystonia is sometimes called cranial-cervical dystonia. The incidence is about one case in 20,000 people.

Presentation
The main symptoms involve involuntary blinking and chin thrusting. Some patients may experience excessive tongue protrusion, squinting, light sensitivity, muddled speech, or uncontrollable contraction of the platysma muscle.  Some Meige's patients also have "laryngeal dystonia" (spasms of the larynx). Blepharospasm may lead to embarrassment in social situations, and oromandibular dystonia can affect speech, making it difficult to carry on the simplest conversations. This can cause difficulty in both personal and professional contexts, and in some cases may cause patients to withdraw from social situations.

The condition tends to affect women more frequently than men.

Symptoms
Oromandibular Symptoms
difficulty opening the mouth (trismus)
clenching or grinding of the teeth (bruxism)
spasms of jaw opening
sideways deviation or protrusion of the jaw
lip tightening and pursing
drawing back (retraction) of the corners of the mouth
deviation or protrusion of the tongue.
jaw pain
difficulties eating and drinking
difficulties speaking (dysarthria)

Blepharospasm symptoms
the first symptom to appear is an increased rate of blinking
uncontrollable squinting/closing of eyes
light sensitivity (photophobia)
squinting/eyes closing during speech
uncontrollable eyes closing shut (rare instances completely causing blindness)

In addition, in some patients, the dystonic spasms may sometimes be provoked by certain activities, such as talking, chewing, or biting. Particular activities or sensory tricks may sometimes temporarily alleviate OMD symptoms, including chewing gum, talking, placing a toothpick in the mouth, lightly touching the lips or chin, or applying pressure beneath the chin.

Diagnosis
Meige's is commonly misdiagnosed and most doctors will not be familiar with this condition due to its rare incidence. Usually, a neurologist specializing in psychomotor disorders can detect Meige's. There are currently no technological diagnostic tools to detect Meige's, as it cannot be identified using blood chemistry analysis or radiological imaging, such as MRI or CT scans. A patient presenting with signs of OMD alone may be misdiagnosed with TMJD.

Patients with idiopathic Meige's syndrome do not quickly respond to anticholinergic drug treatments, a diagnostic sign that can help differentiate it from acute dystonia, which does respond to anticholinergic drugs.

Upper and lower dystonia types
The Greek word blepharon means "eyelid". Spasm means "uncontrolled muscle contraction". The term blepharospasm ['blef-a-ro-spaz-m] can be applied to any abnormal blinking or eyelid tic or twitch resulting from any cause, ranging from dry eyes to Tourette's syndrome to tardive dyskinesia. The blepharospasm referred to here is officially called benign essential blepharospasm (BEB) to distinguish it from the less serious secondary blinking disorders. "Benign" indicates the condition is not life-threatening, and "essential" is a medical term meaning "of unknown cause". It is both a cranial and a focal dystonia. Cranial refers to the head and focal indicates confinement to one part. The word dystonia describes abnormal involuntary sustained muscle contractions and spasms. Patients with blepharospasm have normal eyes. The visual disturbance is due solely to the forced closure of the eyelids.

Oromandibular dystonia (OMD) is a form of focal dystonia that affects varying areas of the head and neck including the lower face, jaw, tongue and larynx.  The spasms may cause the mouth to pull open, shut tight, or move repetitively.  Speech and swallowing may be distorted.  It is often associated with dystonia of the cervical muscles (Spasmodic Torticollis), eyelids (Blepharospasm), or larynx (Spasmodic Dysphonia).

In patients with OMD, involuntary contractions may involve the muscles used for chewing (masticatory muscles). These may include the thick muscle in the cheek that closes the jaw (masseter muscle) and the broad muscle that draws back the lower jaw and closes the mouth (temporalis muscle). Some patients may also experience involuntary contractions of the wide muscle at the side of the neck (platysmal muscle). This muscle draws down the corner of the mouth and lower lip or other muscle groups.

Treatment
In some cases Meige's syndrome can be reversed when it is caused by medication. Botulinum toxin injections can be helpful for the blepharospasm and for masseter spasm.

See also
 Mogigraphia

References

External links 

Extrapyramidal and movement disorders
Dystonia
Syndromes affecting the eye
Syndromes affecting teeth